Mantada is a village in Krishna district of the Indian state of Andhra Pradesh. It is located in Pamidimukkala mandal of Vuyyuru revenue division.
Mantada is 31kms away from vijayawada
Mantada is 37kms away from machilipatnam
nearby railway stations Vijayawada Junction railway station, Gudivada Junction railway station and Machilipatnam railway station

References 

Villages in Krishna district
Villages in Andhra Pradesh Capital Region